The Toro Rosso STR11 is a Formula One racing car designed by Scuderia Toro Rosso to compete in the 2016 Formula One season. The car was driven by Carlos Sainz, Jr. and Daniil Kvyat, who swapped seats with Max Verstappen, who drove the car in the first four Grands Prix of the season. It used customer Ferrari's -specification power unit, the 060.

History
Prior to the  season, both Toro Rosso and parent team Red Bull Racing used engines supplied by Renault. However, frustrated by the unreliability of the Renault Energy F1-2015 and its lack of power relative to rivals Mercedes and Ferrari, Red Bull terminated the partnership at the end of the 2015 season. While Red Bull later renewed the relationship—albeit with engines rebadged as TAG Heuer—Toro Rosso secured a new supply deal with Ferrari. Given the lateness of the deal, the substantial revisions made to the 059 series of engines between the 2015 and 2016 seasons, and the time taken to manufacture new components, Ferrari secured permission from the FIA to supply Toro Rosso with a 2015-specification 060 engine, but no direct factory support from Ferrari as opposed to the 061 used by Ferrari's works team and customer teams Haas and Sauber. Toro Rosso had already collaborated with Ferrari from 2007 through 2013.

Complete Formula One results
(key) (results in bold indicate pole position; results in italics indicate fastest lap)

References

External links

 The car at Toro Rosso's official website

Toro Rosso Formula One cars
2016 Formula One season cars